National Highway 765 (NH 765), is a National Highway in India, which was formed as a new National Highway by up-gradation and passes through the states of Telangana and Andhra Pradesh. It starts at Hyderabad of Telangana and ends at Tokapelle road of Andhra Pradesh.

Route 

It starts at the junction of Hyderabad of Telangana and passes through Kalwakurthy, Srisailam, Dornala and ends at Tokapelle road in Andhra Pradesh.

State–wise route length (in km.)
 Telangana – 
 Andhra Pradesh –

Junctions  

  Terminal near Hyderabad.
  near Kalwakurthy.
  near Dornala.
  Terminal near Tokapelle road.

See also 
 List of National Highways in India
 List of National Highways in India by state
 List of National Highways in Andhra Pradesh

References

External links 

765
765
National highways in India
Transport in Hyderabad, India